The Port of Thessaloniki is one of the largest seaports in the Eastern Mediterranean. It is considered the gateway Port to the Balkans and South East Europe, located in Macedonia, Greece close to the major Trans-European motorway and railway networks with direct access to the Southeastern European countries. 

The port is operated by ThPA S.A. which is listed on the Athens Exchange since 2001, is authorized with AEO license and handles containers, conventional cargo, operates the free zone of the Port, offers intermodal rail services as well as serves passenger traffic through cruise and ferry. Following the privatization process, 67% of the Company’s share capital was transferred to South Europe Gateway Thessaloniki (SEGT) Ltd on March 23, 2018. SEGT Ltd. consists of "Deutsche Invest Equity Partners GmbH" (47%), "Terminal Link SAS" (33%) and "Belterra Investments Ltd." (20%). The Greek State, via HRADF, retains a stake of 7.27% of ThPA S.A. and the remaining 25.73% is free float. On June 4, 2021, the shareholding structure of SEGT Ltd. was changed since shareholder “Belterra Investments Ltd.” purchased the entire share of "Deutsche Invest Equity Partners GmbH", therefore owning 67% and consequently becoming the controlling shareholder of SEGT Ltd. 
7 December 2021 Belterra, Interests Ivan Savvidis, purchased a 299,855 shares of ThPS, with an acquisition price of 26 euros per share. Before this acquisition, Belterra has already taken 189,447 shares that accounted for 1.88% of the total paid-up share capital of the Company. Following the above acquisition, the total number of shares and equal voting rights of the company directly owned by Belterra is 489,332 and corresponds to 4.85% of its share capital.Therefore, the total number of shares and the equivalent voting rights of the OPTRERRA, both directly and indirectly - through its direct participation in SEGT (which holds 67% of the shares and voting rights of the GACH) - amounts to 7,242 .932, which accounts for 71.85% of its share capital, from 68.88%, held before the transaction described.

Statistics
In 2021 the Port of Thessaloniki handled 17.416.807 tonnes of cargo and 471.063 TEU, making it one of the busiest cargo ports in Greece and the second largest container port in the country.

General Statistics between 2020 and 2021  (in tonnes)

Services

Container Terminal
The Port of Thessaloniki is the country’s largest export port and the main sea gate of the Balkans and Southeast Europe. Containers are handled through a specially designed area located in the western part of Pier 6. The 550m long and 340m wide Container Terminal is part of the Free Zone, connected with the national rail network, and extends over a surface area of 254,000 m2. For the time being, it can accommodate small and medium-sized ships (feeder vessels) with a draught of up to 12 meters and maximum capacity of 550,000 TEU.

Conventional Cargo Terminal
The Port of Thessaloniki is the first Conventional Cargo Transit Port of Greece and one of the main ports in the Eastern Mediterranean. It has fourteen (14) quays suitable for all types of bulk and break bulk cargo, all of them connected to the national and international rail networks. The total length of quay walls is 4,200 meters.

Cruise & Ferry

The Port of Thessaloniki has one of the largest passenger terminals in the Aegean Sea basin. The building of the passenger terminal, previously the customs house, was constructed in the last three years of the Ottoman period (1909-1912) by the local Jewish architect Eli Modiano, based on designs by the Franco-Levantine architect Alexander Vallaury.

The Passenger Terminal of the Port of Thessaloniki is fully compliant with the International Ship and Port Facility Security Code (ISPS Code) and has facilities for the reception and service of passenger traffic (cruise and ferry). Thessaloniki, due to its proximity to places of great cultural interest and the very close distance of the port from the city center, has been an increasingly popular cruise destination in recent years. The Port of Thessaloniki has ferry connections with the islands of the Northeast Aegean, the Cyclades, the Sporades (Skiathos, Skopelos and Alonissos) and Izmir.

Logistic Activities/Development of Spaces
In the port zone, outdoor storage areas and warehouses are rented for logistics activities. Specifically, ThPA S.A. has 45,000 m2 of covered space for different types of logistic activities and 670,000 m2 of outdoor storage areas available for rent. At the same time, ThPA S.A. has outdoor and indoor facilities that can accommodate various activities and events. ThPA S.A. has developed and operates two modern outdoor car parking lots in Piers No 1 & No 2, with a total capacity of 595 vehicles.

Thessaloniki Port Intermodal Rail Services
ThPA S.A. from November 27, 2020 offers Intermodal Rail Services with direct rail connectivity between the Port of Thessaloniki and the Company's dry port in Sofia, Bulgaria. Additionally, from August 2022, ThPA S.A. offers direct rail connectivity between the Port of Thessaloniki and Nis (Serbia).

Other

In the area above the port, traditionally called "Vardaris" (and "Varonou Hirs", Baron Hirsch, a quarter of the area), the Holocaust Museum of Greece, among others, is being constructed. The old railway station, from where the Jews of the city were deported to Auschwitz concentration camp, was located in this area and the museum is being constructed on land leased by the Hellenic Railways Organisation. The Municipality of Thessaloniki also wants to create a Metropolitan Park, a Memorial Park and a Jewish school in the same area.

References

Ports and harbours of the Aegean Sea
Ports and harbours of Greece
Port